In mathematics, a quadratic polynomial is a polynomial of degree two in one or more variables. A quadratic function is the polynomial function defined by a quadratic polynomial. Before 20th century, the distinction was unclear between a polynomial and its associated polynomial function; so "quadratic polynomial" and "quadratic function" were almost synonymous. This is still the case in many elementary courses, where both terms are often abbreviated as "quadratic". 

For example, a univariate (single-variable) quadratic function has the form

where  is its variable. The graph of a univariate quadratic function is a parabola, a curve that has an axis of symmetry parallel to the -axis.

If a quadratic function is equated with zero, then the result is a quadratic equation. The solutions of a quadratic equation are  the zeros of the corresponding quadratic function.

The bivariate case in terms of variables  and  has the form

with at least one of  not equal to zero. The zeros of this quadratic function is, in general (that is, if a certain expression of the coefficients is not equal to zero), a conic section (a circle or other ellipse, a parabola, or a hyperbola).

where at least one of the coefficients  of the second-degree terms is not zero. 

A quadratic function can have an arbitrarily large number of variables. The set of its zero form a quadric, which is a surface in the case of three variables and a hypersurface in general case.

Etymology

The adjective quadratic comes from the Latin word quadrātum ("square"). A term raised to the second power like  is called a square in algebra because it is the area of a square with side .

Terminology

Coefficients
The coefficients of a quadric function are often  taken to be real or complex numbers, but they may be taken in any ring, in which case the domain and the codomain are this ring (see polynomial evaluation).

Degree
When using the term "quadratic polynomial", authors sometimes mean "having degree exactly 2", and sometimes "having degree at most 2". If the degree is less than 2, this may be called a "degenerate case". Usually the context will establish which of the two is meant.

Sometimes the word "order" is used with the meaning of "degree", e.g. a second-order polynomial.  However, where the "degree of a polynomial" refers to the largest degree of a non-zero term of the polynomial, more typically "order" refers to the lowest degree of a non-zero term of a power series.

Variables

A quadratic polynomial may involve a single variable x (the univariate case), or multiple variables such as x, y, and z (the multivariate case).

The one-variable case

Any single-variable quadratic polynomial may be written as 

where x is the variable, and a, b, and c represent the coefficients. Such polynomials often arise in a quadratic equation   The solutions to this equation are called the roots and can be expressed in terms of the coefficients as the quadratic formula.  Each quadratic polynomial has an associated quadratic function, whose graph is a parabola.

Bivariate and multivariate cases

Any quadratic polynomial with two variables may be written as 

Such polynomials are fundamental to the study of conic sections, as the implicit equation of a conic section is obtained by equating to zero a quadratic polynomial, and the zeros of a quadratic function form a (possibly degenerate) conic section.
  
Similarly, quadratic polynomials with three or more variables correspond to quadric surfaces or hypersurfaces.  

Quadratic polynomials that have only terms of degree two are called quadratic forms.

Forms of a univariate quadratic function
A univariate quadratic function can be expressed in three formats:

   is called the standard form,

The coefficient  is the same value in all three forms. To convert the standard form to vertex form, one needs a process called completing the square. To convert the factored form (or vertex form) to standard form, one needs to multiply, expand and/or distribute the factors.

Graph of the univariate function

Regardless of the format, the graph of a univariate quadratic function  is a parabola (as shown at the right). Equivalently, this is the graph of the bivariate quadratic equation .

 If , the parabola opens upwards.
 If , the parabola opens downwards.

The coefficient  controls the degree of curvature of the graph; a larger magnitude of   gives the graph a more closed (sharply curved) appearance.

The coefficients  and  together control the location of the axis of symmetry of the parabola (also the -coordinate of the vertex and the h parameter in the vertex form) which is at 

The coefficient  controls the height of the parabola; more specifically, it is the height of the parabola  where it intercepts the -axis.

Vertex

The vertex of a parabola is the place where it turns; hence, it is also called the turning point. Using the method of completing the square, one can turn the standard form

into
 
so the vertex, of the parabola in standard form is
 
If the quadratic function is in factored form

the average of the two roots, i.e.,
 
is the -coordinate of the vertex, and hence the vertex  is
 

The vertex is also the maximum point if , or the minimum point if .

The vertical line

 

that passes through the vertex is also the axis of symmetry of the parabola.

Maximum and minimum points

Using calculus, the vertex point, being a maximum or minimum of the function, can be obtained by finding the roots of the derivative:

 is a root of  if 
resulting in

with the corresponding function value

so again the vertex point coordinates, can be expressed as

Roots of the univariate function

Exact roots

 

Upper bound on the magnitude of the roots

The modulus of the roots of a quadratic  can be no greater than  where  is the golden ratio

The square root of a univariate quadratic function
The square root of a univariate quadratic function gives rise to one of the four conic sections, almost always either to an ellipse or to a hyperbola.

If  then the equation  describes a hyperbola, as can be seen by squaring both sides. The directions of the axes of the hyperbola are determined by the ordinate of the minimum point of the corresponding parabola  If the ordinate is negative, then the hyperbola's major axis (through its vertices) is horizontal, while if the ordinate is positive then the hyperbola's major axis is vertical.

If  then the equation  describes either a circle or other ellipse or nothing at all.  If the ordinate of the maximum point of the corresponding parabola
 is positive, then its square root describes an ellipse, but if the ordinate is negative then it describes an empty locus of points.

Iteration
To iterate a function , one applies the function repeatedly, using the output from one iteration as the input to the next.

(The superscript can be extended to negative numbers, referring to the iteration of the inverse of  if the inverse exists.) But there are some analytically tractable cases.

For example, for the iterative equation

one has

where
 and 
So by induction,

can be obtained, where  can be easily computed as

Finally, we have

as the solution.

See Topological conjugacy for more detail about the relationship between f and g. And see Complex quadratic polynomial for the chaotic behavior in the general iteration.

The logistic map

with parameter 2<r<4 can be solved in certain cases, one of which is chaotic and one of which is not. In the chaotic case r=4 the solution is

For rational , after a finite number of iterations  maps into a periodic sequence. But almost all  are irrational, and, for irrational ,  never repeats itself – it is non-periodic and exhibits sensitive dependence on initial conditions, so it is said to be chaotic.

The solution of the logistic map when r=2 is

Since  for any value of  other than the unstable fixed point 0, the term  goes to 0 as n goes to infinity, so  goes to the stable fixed point

Bivariate (two variable) quadratic function

A bivariate quadratic function is a second-degree polynomial of the form

where A, B, C, D, and E are fixed coefficients and F is the constant term.
Such a function describes a quadratic surface.  Setting  equal to zero describes the intersection of the surface with the plane  which is a locus of points equivalent to a conic section.

Minimum/maximum

If  the function has no maximum or minimum; its graph forms a hyperbolic paraboloid.

In this case the minimum or maximum occurs at  where:

If  and  the function has no maximum or minimum; its graph forms a parabolic cylinder.

If  and  the function achieves the maximum/minimum at a line—a minimum if A>0 and a maximum if A<0; its graph forms a parabolic cylinder.

See also
 Quadratic form
 Quadratic equation
 Matrix representation of conic sections
 Quadric
 Periodic points of complex quadratic mappings
 List of mathematical functions

References

Algebra 1, Glencoe, 
Algebra 2, Saxon,

External links
 

Polynomial functions
Parabolas